Psilothrix is a genus of soft-winged flower beetles belonging to the family Melyridae, subfamily Dasytinae.

Subgenus and species
The genus is divided in the following two subgenera:

 Dolichomorphus Fiori, 1905
 Psilothrix Küster, 1850
 Psilothrix aureola (Kiesenwetter, 1859)
 Psilothrix illustris (Wollaston, 1854)
 Psilothrix latipennis Pic, 1900
 Psilothrix melanostoma (Brullé, 1832)
 Psilothrix protensa (Gené, 1836)
 Psilothrix severa (Kiesenwetter, 1859)
 Psilothrix smaragdina (Lucas, 1847)
 Psilothrix ultramarina (Schaufuss, 1867)
 Psilothrix viridicoerulea (Geoffroy, 1785)

Gallery

References

 Fauna europaea

Melyridae
Beetles of Europe
Cleroidea genera